Germán Iván Meraz Lima (born 19 June 1986) is a Mexican professional boxer.

NABF title fights
Meraz has twice fought for the NABF title - losing in a bid for the bantamweight title to Tomoki Kameda and losing in a bid for the super flyweight title to José Salgado Fernández.

Other notable opponents
Meraz is one of two fighters to have gone the distance with Gervonta Davis and also gone the distance with other notable fighters like Rau'shee Warren and Juan Carlos Payano. He has been stopped by Juan Francisco Estrada, Hugo Ruiz and Tugstsogt Nyambayar.

References

External links

1986 births
Living people
Mexican male boxers
Flyweight boxers
Super-flyweight boxers
Bantamweight boxers
Super-bantamweight boxers
Boxers from Sonora
People from Agua Prieta